Victoria Barr may refer to:

 Vicki Barr (athlete) (born 1982), British sprinter
 Victoria Barr (painter) (born 1937), American artist, painter, and set designer